Antonije Ristić-Pljakić was Karađorđe's duke and son-in-law. He was from Kamenica in Šumadija. He died in 1832.

At the beginning of the First Serbian Uprising, during the conquest of Rudnik on February 27 and 28, 1804, Antonije killed the caravan museli (Turkish chief of police for Kraljevo) at Pljakovo after which he was nicknamed Pljakić.

Antonije Ristić, nicknamed Pljakić, married in 1806 Karađorđević's eldest daughter Savka Karađorđević, with whom he had four sons and one daughter. As the Duke of Karanovac in 1813, he was also the commander-in-chief of the reserves and the duke over the nahijas of Požega, Pazar, Kruševac and one of Hadži-Prodan's Old Vlach principalities.

In Karanovac, in the very trench named after him, he had a house in which he lived until the collapse of the First Serbian Uprising and the transition to Austria, and then to Russia, where he settled and later died on his way back to Serbia.

Sources

See also
 List of Serbian Revolutionaries
 Sima Milosavljević-Paštramac

References

19th-century Serbian people
People of the First Serbian Uprising
Serbian military leaders
Serbian revolutionaries
People from Gornji Milanovac
Year of death missing
Year of birth missing